Ross Benjamin Friedman (born January 8, 1992) is an American former professional soccer player who played for the Columbus Crew and the Dayton Dutch Lions as a defender. In high school he was first team All-MSL, first team all-district, first team all-Ohio, and NSCAA all region. At Harvard University, he  
attained two all-time records at Harvard his senior year with 12 season assists and 17 career assists, and was named 2nd team All-Ivy League. Professionally, he played for the Columbus Crew and the  Dayton Dutch Lions. He and Team USA won the gold medal at the 2013  Maccabiah Games in Israel.

Early life
Friedman is Jewish, and was born in Columbus, Ohio, to Tod and Cheri Friedman, and his hometown was Bexley, Ohio.  He was a member of the Jewish Community Center of Greater Columbus. He began his soccer career at the JCC and on the Columbus Torah Academy recreational FIFA team. He attends both Temple Israel and Beth Jacob Congregation in Columbus.

High school

Friedman attended Bexley High School in Bexley, Ohio where he was a four-year letter winner and captained the Boys' Soccer Team his junior and senior years. During his tenure at Bexley, he led the team to two state semi-final appearances, earning first team All-MSL as a junior, first team all-district, first team all-state and NSCAA all region as a senior. Friedman also played for the Crew Soccer Academy that finished 3rd at the Development Academy finals.

College
Friedman committed to Harvard University (Government, Economics '14) in 2010. He played in 14 games as a freshman, starting four and scoring the game-winning goal against the University of Massachusetts. As a sophomore, he started all 17 games and led the team in points with six assists and six points, receiving an All-Ivy League Honorable Mention. Friedman attained two all-time records at Harvard his senior year by having 12 season assists and 17 career assists, also ranking 6th in the NCAA in assists and 5th in assists per game. He was named 2nd team All-Ivy League as well as named to the Academic All-Ivy League. He helped the Columbus Crew Junior win the 2010 and the 2011 Super-20 championship and was named the all-tournament teams in 2010 and 2012. He was also a member of the fraternity AEPi at Harvard.

Maccabiah Games
In 2013 Friedman helped Team USA capture the gold medal at the 2013  Maccabiah Games in Israel, leading the tournament in assists.  He scored on his penalty kick in the overtime shootout in the championship against Argentina. He said playing in the 2013 Maccabiah Games "was the best and coolest experience in my whole soccer career."

Professional career

Friedman signed as a Homegrown Player with Columbus Crew on January 8, 2014. He was loaned out to their USL Pro affiliate Dayton Dutch Lions in March 2014. On November 18, 2014, the Crew declined his option.

Friedman then played a short while for an Israeli club in southern Tel Aviv. In 2015, a significant injury forced him to retire.

After soccer
Friedman then began a career in real estate, working first for Rockbridge, a private investment firm specializing in hospitality investments, from 2015-18. In 2018 he and some partners started Main + High Investments, a private equity and real estate firm in Columbus.

References

1992 births
Living people
American soccer players
Jewish American sportspeople
Jewish footballers
Harvard Crimson men's soccer players
Columbus Crew players
Dayton Dutch Lions players
Association football defenders
People from Bexley, Ohio
Soccer players from Columbus, Ohio
USL Championship players
Maccabiah Games gold medalists for the United States
Maccabiah Games medalists in football
Competitors at the 2013 Maccabiah Games
Homegrown Players (MLS)
Bexley High School alumni
21st-century American Jews